Spilarctia dukouensis is a moth in the family Erebidae. It was described by Cheng-Lai Fang in 1982. It is found in the Chinese provinces of Sichuan and Yunnan.

References

Moths described in 1982
dukouensis